International District or International Village can refer to:

 Buford Highway community (a.k.a. DeKalb County International Village district) in the Atlanta metro area
 International Village Mall, in Vancouver's Chinatown
 International District (Greater Houston)
 International Village (Gettysburg, Pennsylvania), a defunct shopping center in Gettysburg, Pennsylvania
 Seattle Chinatown-International District
 International District, Albuquerque, New Mexico
International Village, a residence and dining hall at Northeastern University

See also 
 International Villager, 2011 album
 Pestalozzi International Village, an organization in East Sussex, England
 BF International Village, a barangay in Metro Manila, Philippines